Morvin Renata Tewhetu Aroha Edwards (born 8 May 1968) is a New Zealand former professional rugby league footballer who following the footsteps of his father Sam Edwards former NZ Kiwi rugby league player, Morvin represented New Zealand.

Playing career
Edwards played for the Upper Hutt club and represented Wellington before moving to England. He won a premiership with Upper Hutt and captained Wellington to their first ever win over a touring international side.

In England he played for both Swinton and Leeds.

After leaving Leeds he attracted interest from Oldham but ultimately decided to move to Australia and join Balmain. He moved to Penrith in 1995, playing thirty eight games for the club before retiring.

Representative career
In 1990 Edwards played against the touring Great Britain side twice, once for Wellington and once for New Zealand Māori. He was a member of the New Zealand national rugby league team side that toured England the previous year. He played in ten matches for the Kiwis, his last being against France in 1993.

References

Sources
 

1968 births
Living people
New Zealand rugby league players
New Zealand Māori rugby league players
New Zealand Māori rugby league team players
New Zealand national rugby league team players
Wellington rugby league team players
Swinton Lions players
Leeds Rhinos players
Balmain Tigers players
Penrith Panthers players
Upper Hutt Tigers players
Rugby league fullbacks
Rugby league players from Wellington City